Chen Ming-jen (born 10 May 1967) is a politician in the Republic of China. He was the acting Minister of the Mongolian and Tibetan Affairs Commission of the Executive Yuan in September–October 2013.

Early life
Chen obtained his bachelor's degree in law from National Taiwan University in 1989 and master's degree in law from Fu Jen Catholic University in 1993.

See also
 Mongolian and Tibetan Affairs Commission
 Republic of China–Mongolia relations
 Mongolia
 Tibet Autonomous Region
 Executive Yuan

References

Living people
1967 births
Fu Jen Catholic University alumni
National Taiwan University alumni